Kitkajoki or Kitkanjoki is a river of Finland. It begins from the lake Ala-Kitka that is connected to the lake Yli-Kitka in the municipalities of Posio and Kuusamo in the region of Northern Ostrobothnia and flows then towards Russia joining the river Oulankajoki near the Russian border. It is a part of the Kovda river system in Russia and Finland from which the waters flow to the White Sea.

See also
List of rivers of Finland

References

External links
 

Rivers of Finland
Rivers of Kuusamo